The Moselotte is a river in Lorraine, in the French department of Vosges. It is a direct right tributary of the Moselle, and thus a sub-tributary of the Rhine.

Geography 
The Moselotte rises in the massif des Vosges at the fontaine de la Duchesse, near the summit of Hohneck. It flows into the Moselle at Remiremont.

Communes traversed by the Moselotte 
The Moselotte flows through, from upstream to downstream, the communes of La Bresse, Cornimont, Saulxures, Thiéfosse, Vagney, Saint-Amé, Le Syndicat, Dommartin-lès-Remiremont and Saint-Étienne-lès-Remiremont opposite the town of Remiremont.

Main tributaries 
The Moselotte is fed by the following tributaries:

Lakes 
The Moselotte watershed includes numerous natural lakes which are often enhanced by a small barrage, including lac de Blanchemer, lac de Lispach and lac des Corbeaux.

The presence of a high barrage at the foot of Kastelberg since 1983 has resulted in the appearance of the lac de la Lande. It collects water from several sources via conduits, and supplies the La Bresse commune with its energy.

Hydrology – at Vagney station 
Like the majority of Vosges rivers, the Moselotte is very substantial. Its flow rate has been observed during a period of 40 years Vagney at a place called Zainvilliers, which is upstream of the Moselotte's confluence with the Moselle.

From the beginning of May, the flow rate falls off rapidly, reaching  in August, which is not very severe for a body of water of this size. However year by year fluctuation can be more significant, as can those in the short term.

Floods can also be significant particularly bearing in mind the smallness of the watershed, only . The maximum instantaneous flow rates over a 2-year and 5-year period (MIFR2 and MIFR5) measure  respectively.

Comparing these values to the MIFR measurements for the river suggests that the flood on that day was approximately a 10-year event and thus likely to recur frequently.

Overall the Moselotte is an extremely abundant river in its upper course. The runoff curve number in this 53 percent of its watershed is  annually, which is extremely high for the northern part of France, and more than four times higher than the French national average. It is also three times higher than the average over the French basin of the Moselle. The specific flow rate attaches to these facts the portentous figure of 45.7 litres per second per square kilometre of watershed.

Hydrology – at the confluence with the Moselle 
The specific flow rate of the Moselotte rises to 38.5 litres per second per square kilometre of watershed. This, along with the Breuchin (a tributary of the Lanterne and sub-tributary of the Saône which flows elsewhere in the same region) constitutes a record for the north third of France.

The Moselotte is clearly more abundant than the Moselle at their confluence,  against .

Water quality 
While in 2005, the water quality of the Moselotte was classified as category 1B, or "bonne" (good), the situation deteriorated somewhat in 2006, when the Rhine-Meuse water agency concluded that the river water analysed at the level of Autrive was now only "passable", or category 2. The reason was a highly depressed rate of oxygen saturation (also classed as "passable"), which had gone from 76% in 2005 to 69% in 2006. The chemical oxygen demand, at 6.5 mg/L in 2006, was still classified "bonne". The ammonium ion level was measured at 0.09 mg/L, which was classed as "excellent".

Economy 
Highly populated by trout, the river has given rise to a significant breakthrough in fish farming, namely the invention of artificial reproduction by Joseph Remy and Antoine Géhin in the 19th century. The Moselotte basin also has the highest density in the world in small hydroelectric barrages, which serve the watermills, sawmills, spinning and weaving houses along the river and its tributaries.

 The photograph opposite, taken upstream of La Bresse, shows a diversion powering a turbine. The main point has been equipped with a fish ladder.

A railway line once ran along the Moselotte valley between Remiremont and Cornimont. Today it has been transformed into a voie verte (green route) and replaced with bus service provided by TER Grand Est (line L09), extended to La Bresse.

See also 
 List of rivers of France

References

External links 
  Description on the Pays de Remiremont website
  

Rivers of Vosges (department)
Rivers of Grand Est
Rivers of France